The Tennis Girl is a British poster of a female tennis player without underwear that has become a British pop icon.

Creation
The photograph was taken by then-30-year-old Martin Elliott in September 1976 and features 18-year-old Fiona Butler (now Walker), his girlfriend at the time. The photo was taken at the University of Birmingham's tennis courts (formerly Edgbaston Lawn Tennis Club) in Edgbaston Park Road, Birmingham, England. The site is occupied now by the university's Tennis Court halls of residence. The dress was hand-made by Butler's friend Carol Knotts, from a Simplicity Pattern with added lace trim. Knotts also supplied the tennis racquet, with all of the borrowed items later returned by Butler to Knotts after the shoot with a box of chocolates. Butler borrowed the plimsoll shoes from her father, whilst the tennis balls were those used as playthings by her family's pet dog.

History
The image was first published as part of a calendar by Athena for the 1977 Silver Jubilee, the same year Virginia Wade achieved the Wimbledon ladies' singles title. Athena then negotiated a licence to distribute the image as a poster, where from 1978 it achieved widespread distribution, selling over 2 million copies at £2 per poster. Although Athena went into administration in 1995, the picture remains a popular print to buy and can be found at other retailers like Amazon, AllPosters and King and McGaw.
 
Butler, who broke up with Elliot three years later, said in retrospect that she was not embarrassed about posing, nor bitter that she did not receive any royalties from the photo. Butler (now Walker) is a mother of three, who works as a freelance illustrator in Droitwich Spa, Worcestershire. Elliott died on 24 March 2010. Knotts, now a barrister living in Gloucestershire, put the dress and racquet up for sale at an auction on 5 July 2014, the day of the 2014 Wimbledon Championships – Women's Singles final. The dress was sold for £15,000, while the racquet went for between £1000 and £2000. The Athena Tennis Girl poster dress is now part of the Wimbledon Museum collection.

Subject doubts
In February 2015, Peter Atkinson from Marsh Gate, Cornwall, came forward to insist the photo was actually of his ex-wife, producing in evidence two items, one showing the same image and the other a close variant (seemingly taken on the same occasion), both of which were dated 1974, two years before Fiona Butler's photo shoot.  Atkinson had previously made the claim, on numerous occasions, that his ex-wife was the actual model, and had done so during Elliott's lifetime.  Elliott consistently denied such claims.

Parody
Over the years, the picture has been parodied by various people as diverse as former tennis star Pat Cash, singer and actress Kylie Minogue and comedian Alan Carr with actor Keith Lemon featuring his parody in his 2012 calendar.

As an election promise for the 2012 Belgian elections, Milka Malfait, a 22-year-old candidate from Sint-Truiden promised to publish a nude photo shoot when receiving 1,000 votes. She released a picture of herself in the Tennis Girl pose prior to the elections.
 
In 2009, it was also parodied in the exit scene from episode 12 from the sixth series of Shameless when Lillian Tyler, a character played by Alice Barry, gets up and walks towards the door after winning a game console version of tennis.
 
The background of Martin Rowson's cartoon, "Don't feed the Trolls", appears to show a poster of Donald Trump as Tennis Girl.

See also

Sports photography
Hang in there, Baby

References

 
1976 works
1976 in art
Nude photography
Posters
Sportswear
Sports photographs
Tennis culture
Tennis mass media
University of Birmingham
Women's tennis
1970s photographs
Color photographs